Chicago 17 is the fourteenth studio album by American band Chicago, released on May 14, 1984. It was the group's second release for Full Moon/Warner Bros. Records, their second album to be produced by David Foster and their last with founding bassist/vocalist Peter Cetera.

Four singles were released from the album, all of which placed in the top 20 on the Billboard Hot 100 chart. The success of the singles propelled Chicago 17 to achieve an RIAA certification of six times platinum. Chicago 17 remains the biggest-selling album in the band's history.

In 1985, the album received three Grammy Awards. David Foster won for Producer of the Year, Non-Classical (tied in this category with Lionel Richie and James Anthony Carmichael), Humberto Gatica won for Best Engineered Recording – Non-Classical, and David Foster and Jeremy Lubbock won for Best Instrumental Arrangement Accompanying Vocal(s) for "Hard Habit to Break" which was also nominated for Record of the Year, Best Pop Performance by a Duo or Group With Vocals and Best Vocal Arrangement for Two or More Voices. In his review of the album for AllMusic, music critic Stephen Thomas Erlewine says Chicago 17 is "the pinnacle of [producer David Foster's] craft and one of the best adult contemporary records of the '80s," and one of the most influential albums "within its style." Writing for Billboard, Bobby Olivier said the album "is one of the greatest pure power ballad albums of all time — or at least from 1984 — and "[Hard] Habit [to Break]" is one of the finest entries."

In 2006, Rhino Entertainment remastered and reissued the album, using the original analog versions of "Please Hold On" (which was co-written with Lionel Richie who was enjoying success from his album Can't Slow Down) and "Prima Donna" and adding a Robert Lamm demo, "Here Is Where We Begin" as a bonus track.

Artwork, packaging

In keeping with the majority of their albums up to that time (1984), the traditional "Chicago" logo, designed by John Berg and Nick Fasciano, is the main feature of the album cover. It does not feature any photos of the group.  In a 2020 article for Muse by Clio, it was listed among "Nine Great Album Covers, Chosen by Gregory Sylvester." Sylvester describes the cover as, " ... an illusion of a package within a package ... brown kraft paper, twine and a faux red stamp." The album cover looks like a package wrapped in brown paper tied with twine and (on the back) secured with tape. On the front, the "Chicago" logo appears to be in bas-relief (it is not), covered by the wrapping paper. The number "17," in Arabic numerals rather than the Roman numerals used by the group formerly, appears to be stamped on the wrapping paper below the logo.  In the upper left-hand quadrant of the cover back, a pink "receipt form" is depicted (designated as a "TOPS FORM 3014" in small print at the bottom of the "receipt"), tucked underneath the "twine," with the "Chicago" logo stamped on it near the top in purple ink and, below the logo, a "DESCRIPTION OF PACKAGE" lists the tracks on side one and side two. The bottom of the "receipt form" shows production and engineering credits and the Warner Bros. logo "stamped" on the slip. On the inner dust sleeve, a large group photo of the band appears on one side: (back row, left to right) Lee Loughnane, Bill Champlin, James Pankow, Walt Parazaider, Robert Lamm, (front row, left to right) Danny Seraphine, Peter Cetera. The reverse side of the dust sleeve gives track listings, song lyrics, and song and album credits, including credits for artwork and packaging: Art Direction/Design, Simon Levy; Album Cover Art, Larry Vigon; Photography, Harry Langdon, James Goble.

Track listing

Some songs were recorded during the Chicago 17 sessions but not released. "Good for Nothing" was later released on the We Are the World superstar charity album in 1985. This is the last released Chicago song to feature Peter Cetera on vocals.

A song called "Sweet Marie" recorded during sessions for the Chicago 17 album has been performed by the Norwegian band TOBB. Bill Champlin offered this song to the band. It was released on May 14, 2014 by TOBB, the 30th anniversary of the Chicago 17 albums release. It was performed by Chicago on rare occasions in 1984, and has surfaced online from VHS recordings of some of their performances.

A subsequent international release in 2010 (included in the Studio Albums 1979 - 2008 boxed set from 2015) has the original album restored, with additional bonus tracks of alternate versions of "Only You", "You're the Inspiration", and "Prima Donna" as well as "Here Is Where We Begin". A demo version of "Hard Habit to Break" exists with Robert Lamm on vocals, as briefly heard during the documentary “Now More Than Ever: The History of Chicago.”

Personnel 
All information in this section from except as noted.

Chicago
 Peter Cetera – lead and backing vocals, bass guitar on "Stay the Night"; arrangements on "Stay the Night", "Along Comes a Woman", "You're the Inspiration", and "Prima Donna"; vocal arrangements on "Remember the Feeling"
 Bill Champlin – keyboards, guitars, lead and backing vocals, vocal arrangements on "Only You"
 Robert Lamm – keyboards, lead and backing vocals, arrangements on "We Can Stop the Hurtin'", vocal arrangements on "Only You"
 Lee Loughnane – trumpet
 James Pankow – trombone, horn arrangements, arrangements on "Once In a Lifetime"
 Walter Parazaider – woodwinds
 Chris Pinnick – guitars
 Danny Seraphine – drums

Additional personnel
 David Foster – keyboards, synthesizer programming, synth basses on all tracks (except "Stay the Night"), additional arrangements
 Erich Bulling – synthesizer programming
 Marcus Ryle – synthesizer programming
 John Van Tongeren – synthesizer programming
 Mark Goldenberg – guitars, additional arrangements on "Along Comes a Woman" and "Prima Donna"
 Paul Jackson Jr. – guitars
 Michael Landau – guitars
 Jeff Porcaro – drums (uncredited) on "Stay the Night"
 John Robinson – drums (uncredited) on "Please Hold On"
 Carlos Vega – drums (uncredited) on "You're the Inspiration"
 Paulinho da Costa – percussion
 Greg Adams – trumpet
 Gary Grant – trumpet
 Jeremy Lubbock – string arrangements on "Hard Habit to Break", "Remember the Feeling", "You're the Inspiration" and "Once In a Lifetime"
 Jules Chakin – string contractor 
 Gerald Vinci – concertmaster 
 Kenny Cetera – backing vocals on "Stay the Night", "Prima Donna", "You're the Inspiration", and "Along Comes a Woman"
 Donny Osmond – backing vocals on "We Can Stop the Hurtin
 Richard Marx – backing vocals on "We Can Stop the Hurtin
 David Pack – duet vocals on "Here Is Where We Begin"

Production
 David Foster – producer 
 Humberto Gatica – engineer, mixing 
 Terry Christian – assistant engineer 
 Eddie Delena – assistant engineer
 Laura Livingston – assistant engineer
 Larry Fergusson – mix assistant, additional overdubs
 Paul Lani – additional overdubs
 Simon Levy – art direction, design 
 Larry Vigon – album cover art
 James Goble – photography 
 Harry Langdon – photography 
 Recorded at The Lighthouse (North Hollywood, CA); Sunset Sound (Hollywood, CA); Record Plant (Los Angeles, CA).
 Mixed at Lion Share Recording Studio (Los Angeles, CA).

Production for 2006 reissue
 Jeff Magid – project supervision, mixing (bonus selections)
 David Donnelly – mixing (bonus selections), remastering 
 Cory Frye – editorial supervision
 Greg Allen – art direction, design 
 Karen LeBlanc – project assistance 
 Steve Woolard – project assistance 
 Mixed at DNA Studio (Studio City, California)
 Mastered at DNA Mastering (Studio City, California)

Charts

Weekly charts

Year-end charts

Certifications

References

Chicago (band) albums
1984 albums
Albums produced by David Foster
Full Moon Records albums
Warner Records albums
Grammy Award for Best Engineered Album, Non-Classical